Gelidibacter is a Gram-negative and rod-shaped bacteria genus from the family of Flavobacteriaceae.

References

Further reading 
 
 
 
 

Flavobacteria
Bacteria genera